State universities are public universities run by the state government of each of the states and territories of India, and are usually established by a local legislative assembly act. The University Grants Commission (UGC), draws its power from the University Grants Commission Act, 1956. In addition, 15 Professional Councils are established, controlling different aspects of accreditation and coordination. The UGC publishes and regularly updates the lists of state universities. , the UGC lists 459 active state universities. The oldest establishment date listed by the UGC is 1857, shared by the University of Calcutta, the University of Madras and the University of Mumbai.

Section 12 (B) of the UGC Act of 1956 also grants the UGC the right to "allocate and disburse, out of the Fund of the Commission, grants to Universities..." As such, the UGC categorizes state universities as either "declared fit to receive Central/UGC assistance under Section 12 (B) of the UGC Act–1956", or not, and notes this status at the lists published. Updates to these declarations are done in meetings of the UGC and published in the minutes. The latest list, lists 267 universities as fit to receive Central/UGC assistance.

Other types of universities controlled by the UGC include:
 Central universities, or Union universities are established by Act of Parliament and are under the purview of the Department of Higher Education in the Union Human Resource Development Ministry.
 Deemed university, or "Deemed-to-be-University", is a status of autonomy granted by the Department of Higher Education on the advice of the UGC, under Section 3 of UGC Act, 1956.
 Private universities are approved by the UGC. They can grant degrees but they are not allowed to have off-campus affiliated colleges.

Apart from the above universities, other institutions are granted the permission to autonomously award degrees. These institutes do not affiliate colleges and are not officially called "universities" but "autonomous organizations" or "autonomous institutes". They fall under the administrative control of the Department of Higher Education. These organizations include the Indian Institutes of Technology, the National Institutes of Technology, the Indian Institutes of Science Education and Research, the Indian Institutes of Management (though these award diplomas, not degrees) and other autonomous institutes.

Universities by state
Of the State of India there are state universities in all states except  Meghalaya, Mizoram and Nagaland. The state with the most state universities in India is West Bengal with 37 universities. Of the union territories, there are state universities in Chandigarh, Delhi, Jammu and Kashmir, Ladakh and Puducherry.

List of universities

In the list below, the term "Section 12 (B)?" refers to being "declared fit to receive Central/UGC assistance under Section 12 (B) of the UGC Act–1956". The year of establishment is the year stated by the UGC. Cases where this year is different than the year stated by the university are noted. Differences in title are also noted, except minor typographical errors and "University of X"/"X University" differences.

Andhra Pradesh 
There are 27 state universities in Andhra Pradesh.

Arunachal Pradesh 
There is one state university in Arunachal Pradesh.

Assam 
There are 18 state universities in Assam.

Bihar 
There are 18 state universities in Bihar.

Chandigarh 
There is one state university in Chandigarh.

Chhattisgarh 
There are 16 state universities in Chhattisgarh.

Delhi 
There are eleven state universities in Delhi.

Goa 
There is one state university in Goa.

Gujarat 
There are 30 state universities in Gujarat.

Haryana 
There are 20 state universities in Haryana.

Himachal Pradesh 
There are seven state universities in Himachal Pradesh.

Jammu and Kashmir 
There are nine state universities in Jammu and Kashmir.

Jharkhand 
There are 11 state universities in Jharkhand.

Karnataka 
There are 34 state universities in Karnataka.

Kerala 
There are 15 state universities in Kerala.

Madhya Pradesh 
There are 24 state universities in Madhya Pradesh.

Maharashtra 
There are 26 state universities in Maharashtra.

Manipur 
There are three state university in Manipur.

Odisha 
There are 22 state universities in Odisha.

Puducherry 
There is one state universities in Puducherry.

Punjab 
There are 14 state universities in Punjab.

Rajasthan 
There are 26 state universities in Rajasthan.

Sikkim 
There are two state universities in Sikkim.

Tamil Nadu 
There are 22 state universities in Tamil Nadu.

Telangana 
There are 17 state universities in Telangana.

Tripura 
There is one state university in Tripura.

Uttar Pradesh 
There are 33 state universities in Uttar Pradesh.

Uttarakhand 
There are 11 state universities in Uttarakhand.

West Bengal 
There are 37 state universities in West Bengal.

See also
 List of universities in India
 List of central universities in India
 List of deemed universities in India
 List of private universities in India
 List of autonomous higher education institutes in India

Notes

References

External links
 List of state universities in India

state universities